Peshmerga is a documentary film by the French intellectual Bernard-Henri Lévy. It was granted a late entry to the 2016 Cannes Film Festival as a special screening. It consists of a "close-up look" at the Peshmerga, the fighting force of the Kurds, battling to establish the state of Kurdistan across the existing states of Syria, Iraq, Iran, and Turkey.

See also 
 Kurdish Cinema
 Gulîstan, Land of Roses, a 2016 documentary film about women PKK fighters

References

External links 
 

Documentary films about the Iraq War
2016 films
2016 documentary films
Kurdish culture
Iraqi documentary films
Films shot in Iraq
Documentary films about Iraq
French documentary films
2010s avant-garde and experimental films
Kurdish films
Documentary films about the Syrian civil war
Film
Kurdish culture in France
2010s French films
Kurdish words and phrases